Pinderfields Hospital is an acute District General Hospital in Wakefield, West Yorkshire operated by the Mid Yorkshire Hospitals NHS Trust.

History

The original acute hospital in Wakefield was established as part of the Stanley Royd Hospital and opened on 8 March 1900. It was briefly renamed Wakefield Emergency Hospital before becoming Pinderfields General Hospital in the 1940s. The name derives from the Pinder of Wakefield, the townsmen in charge of impounding stray animals who were tasked with ensuring that no-one dare trespass on Wakefield under their watchful eyes.

A new hospital, to be known as the Pinderfields Hospital, was procured under a Private Finance Initiative contract to replace Pinderfields General Hospital in 2007. The new hospital, which was designed by the Building Design Partnership and built by Balfour Beatty at a cost of circa £150 million, was completed in June 2010. It was opened by the Princess Royal in September 2011.

In January 2018, with overcrowding becoming a serious issue at many hospitals, patients were pictured sleeping on the bare floors of Pinderfields Hospital.

References

External links
 Official site

Buildings and structures in Wakefield
Hospitals in West Yorkshire
Hospital buildings completed in 2010
NHS hospitals in England
2010 establishments in England